Lakhi Ram Nagar is an Indian businessman and politician from the state of Uttar Pradesh, India. He has been a Minister for Irrigation and a member of the Bahujan Samaj Party, representing the 
Kharkhoda, Meerut, Meerut and 
Kithore assembly constituencies of Uttar Pradesh.

References 

Uttar Pradesh MLAs 2007–2012
Businesspeople from Uttar Pradesh
Living people
Year of birth missing (living people)
Bahujan Samaj Party politicians